was a Japanese film director and producer. He directed the 1984 films Sayonara Jupiter and The Return of Godzilla. He died of coronary disease at age 69 while mountain climbing.

Filmography

Director
 Sayonara Jupiter (1984)
 The Return of Godzilla (1984)

Assistant director
 King Kong vs. Godzilla (1962)
 Ghidorah, the Three-Headed Monster (1964)
 Frankenstein vs. Baragon (1965)
 Invasion of Astro-Monster (1965)
 Latitude Zero (1969)
 All Monsters Attack (1969)
 Dodes'ka-den (1970)
 Submersion of Japan (1973)
 Prophecies of Nostradamus (1974)
 The Gate of Youth (1975)
 The Imperial Navy (1981)

References

External links 
 
 
 https://www.tohokingdom.com/people/koji_hashimoto.html

1936 births
2005 deaths
Japanese film directors
Japanese film producers